Statistical associating fluid theory (SAFT)  is a chemical theory, based on perturbation theory, that uses statistical thermodynamics to explain how complex fluids and fluid mixtures form associations through hydrogen bonds. Widely used in industry and academia, it has become a standard approach for describing complex mixtures. Since it was first proposed in 1990, SAFT has been used in a large number of molecular-based equation of state models for describing the Helmholtz energy contribution due to association.

Overview 

SAFT is a Helmholtz energy term that can be used in equations of state that describe the thermodynamic and phase equilibrium properties of pure fluids and fluid mixtures. SAFT was developed using statistical mechanics. SAFT models the Helmholtz free energy contribution due to association, i.e. hydrogen bonding. SAFT can be used in combination with other Helmholtz free energy terms. Other Helmholtz energy contributions consider for example Lennard-Jones interactions, covalent chain-forming bonds, and association (interactions between segments caused by, for example, hydrogen bonding). SAFT has been applied to a wide range of fluids, including supercritical fluids, polymers, liquid crystals, electrolytes, surfactant solutions, and refrigerants.

Development 

SAFT evolved from thermodynamic theories, including perturbation theories developed in the 1960s, 1970s, and 1980s by John Barker and Douglas Henderson, Keith Gubbins and Chris Gray, and, in particular, Michael Wertheim's first-order, thermodynamic perturbation theory (TPT1) outlined in a series of papers in the 1980s. 

SAFT was originally proposed in a 1990 paper titled "New reference equation of state for associating liquids" by Walter Chapman, Keith Gubbins, George Jackson, and Maciej Radosz, which, in 2007, was recognized by Industrial and Engineering Chemistry Research as one of the most highly cited papers of the previous three decades. SAFT improved on earlier, over-simplified theories, which were based on hard spherical molecules that do not associate, by focusing on molecular chain length and association.

Variations 

Many variations of SAFT have been developed since the 1990s, including HR-SAFT (Huang-Radosz SAFT), PC-SAFT (perturbed chain SAFT), PCP-SAFT (polar PC-SAFT), soft-SAFT, polar soft-SAFT, SAFT-VR (variable range), SAFT VR-Mie. Also, the SAFT term was used in combination with cubic equations of state for describing the dispersive-repulsive interactions, for example in the Cubic-Plus-Association (CPA) equation of state model and the SAFT + cubic model  and non-random-lattice (NLF) models based on lattice field theory.

References

Equations of physics
Engineering thermodynamics
Mechanical engineering
Equations of state
Thermodynamic models
Perturbation theory